The Distraction Pieces Podcast is a weekly conversational podcast created and hosted by English spoken word poet and hip-hop artist Scroobius Pip. The podcast began on 13 October 2014 and has been released weekly ever since.

Format
The podcasts are usually around one hour in duration and are released every Wednesday. Pip switched to this format from his radio show on Xfm after appearing on The Joe Rogan Experience and hearing other American long-form interview podcasters such as Marc Maron. Speaking with The Observer's Killian Fox, Pip described the podcast as "interesting conversations with interesting people", adding "obviously it's important to have some big names in there, such as Simon Pegg, Alan Moore and Billy Bragg, but we've also had people such as Dr Suzi Gage, who studies recreational drugs and their potential benefits and negatives, and the mortician Carla Valentine talking about the taboo of death. It can get incredibly heavy – we've had debates about race and mental health – but there's also a lot of silly nonsense". Pip bookends each episode with monologues in which he mentions sponsors for the show, updates the listener on his work, and reflects on the conversations in the podcasts.

Awards
 Nominated for the Entertainment with Maple Street Studios award at the British Podcast Awards in 2017.
 Nominated by the Human Trafficking Foundation for their Anti-Slavery Day media awards for episode 86 (2016)

Distraction Pieces Network
The Distraction Pieces Podcast is the flagship podcast of the eponymous network organised by Pip. Other shows on the network include Brett Goldstein's Films to Be Buried With, Suzi Gage's Say Why to Drugs, Jason Reed's Stop and Search, in association with LEAP UK, and Jim Smallman's Tuesday Night Jaw.

Episodes

References

External links 
 

Audio podcasts
2014 podcast debuts
British podcasts